Scott Stokely is an American professional disc golfer, disc sports (frisbee) teacher, and author.

Scott began playing disc golf in 1976 as a junior member of the Oak Grove Gophers at the World's first permanent Disc Golf Course in Pasadena, California. Stokely published an instructional book and videos about disc golf throwing techniques in 2001 and the first Disc Golf autobiography "Scott Stokely: Growing Up Disc Golf" in January 2020.

Early life

Spending much of his childhood free time at Oak Grove Disc Golf Course gave Scott Stokely the unique opportunity to be mentored by Disc Golf Legends such as: Joe Ursino, Geoff and Johnny Lissaman, Mark Horn, Dan "Stork" Roddick, and Paul Harris. In February 1985, at age 17, Stokely became the youngest player to make the finals at Oak Grove's showcase tournament, the Wintertime Open. Though he was widely considered a disc golf prodigy and showman, Stokely was also known for his arrogant attitude.

Professional career

Scott Stokely earned 17 world and national professional titles in major tournaments before leaving the sport in 2000. Stokely returned to tournament play in 2014 in the Masters Division. Scott returned to the Pro Open Division Disc Golf Pro Tour for the 2022 season.

World distance records

At the 1987 WFDF V Championships, Scott set a Juniors’ distance record of 155.83 meters. In 1995 Stokely threw a Discraft X-clone 200.01 meters, beating the previous Guinness World Records distance record set in 1993 by Niclas Bergehamm. Stokely broke his own record in 1998 throwing a 211.32 meter backhand with a Discraft XL. In 2001, Stokely also set a record for the longest throw sidearm (568 ft) which was not published.

Notable achievements and event timeline 

 1984 Huntington Beach Open - 1st Place Junior Boys
 1987 Bud Light Wintertime Open - 1st Place
 1991 WFDF Distance - 1st Place
 1992 FaultLine (CA State Championships) - 1st Place
1993 Flatts Classic IX - 1st Place
1993 Tennessee OctadecaDISC - 1st Place
1994 PDGA Pro National Doubles - 1st Place
1994 Santa Cruz Master Cup - 1st Place
 1994 WFDF World Overall Championships - 1st Place (Disc Golf)
1995 PDGA National Pro Doubles - 1st Place
1996 PDGA National Doubles Pro - 1st Place 
1996 Veteran's Park Open - 1st Place 
 1997 PDGA World Championships - 2nd Place
1997 Minnesota Majestic - 1st Place
1997 West Virginia Open - 1st Place
1997 Veteran's Park Open - 1st Place
 1998 PDGA World Championships - 2nd Place
1998 3rd Annual Texas State Disc Golf Championships - 1st Place
1999 Bob West Memorial - 1st Place
 2000 Discraft Bob West Memorial -1st Place
2015 Cedar Creek Open - 1st Place
 2015 Beaver State Fling - 1st Place (Masters)
 2022 Big Money OTB Tour Skins - 1st place

References

Living people
American disc golfers
1969 births
American sportsmen
Sportspeople from Pasadena, California